The India national korfball team is managed by the Korfball Federation of India (KFI), representing India in korfball international competitions.

India is the oldest korfball playing country in Asia. Since 1979, when the game was first introduced in India, korfball popularity has continued to rise and now the game is being played in 27 States with each state having its own association to promote and organise events. Korfball is recognised by the Union Ministry for Youth Affairs and Sports, Government of India and national championships in senior, junior and sub-junior categories and the inter-University and inter-school championships are being held regularly.

Tournament History

References

National korfball teams
Korfball
National team